John McKay was a Scottish football player during the mid 1950s. He originally played 'junior' football with Maryhill before signing up with Dumbarton in the summer of 1954. Here he played with distinction, being a constant in the Dumbarton defence for four seasons.

References 

Scottish footballers
Dumbarton F.C. players
Scottish Football League players
Association football defenders
Possibly living people
Year of birth missing